Kazakhstan competed in the Winter Olympic Games as an independent nation for the first time at the 1994 Winter Olympics in Lillehammer, Norway.  Previously, Kazakhstani athletes competed for the Unified Team at the 1992 Winter Olympics.

Medalists

Competitors
The following is the list of number of competitors in the Games.

Alpine skiing 

Men

Women

Biathlon 

Men

Women

Cross-country skiing 

Men

Women

Figure skating 

Ice dancing

Freestyle skiing 

Men

Short track speed skating 

Women

Ski jumping

Speed skating 

Men

Women

References

Official Olympic Reports
International Olympic Committee results database

Nations at the 1994 Winter Olympics
1994
1994 in Kazakhstani sport